Anatoli Viktorovich Fedyukin (26 January 1952 in Voronezh – 29 July 2020) was a Soviet/Russian handball player who competed in the 1976 Summer Olympics and in the 1980 Summer Olympics.

He trained at Zenit in Moscow until 1978 and at the Armed Forces sports society (CSKA) in the same city since then. In 1976 he won the gold medal with the Soviet team. He played three matches including the final.

Four years later he was part of the Soviet team which won the silver medal. He played five matches including the final and scored 21 goals.

References

External links
profile

1952 births
2020 deaths
Sportspeople from Voronezh
Soviet male handball players
Russian male handball players
Armed Forces sports society athletes
Handball players at the 1976 Summer Olympics
Handball players at the 1980 Summer Olympics
Olympic handball players of the Soviet Union
Olympic gold medalists for the Soviet Union
Olympic silver medalists for the Soviet Union
Olympic medalists in handball
Medalists at the 1980 Summer Olympics
Medalists at the 1976 Summer Olympics